The 1962–63 Sussex County Football League season was the 38th in the history of the competition.

This season was abandoned during the winter of 1962–63, when atrocious weather across the country led to postponements of football matches.
This was difficult situation in the Sussex County League as some teams had completed with 21 or 22 games whilst others only completed 13 or 14 times. The league was then abandoned and an emergency competition was set up.
Below are the league tables then the league was abandoned.

Division One
The division featured 17 clubs, 16 which competed in the last season, along with one new club:
Shoreham, promoted from last season's Division Two

League table

Division Two
The division featured 16 clubs, 14 which competed in the last season, along with two new clubs:
Old Varndeanians, relegated from last season's Division One
Hellingly Hospital

League table

Emergency competition
The emergency competition, the clubs were placed into 8 groups, four with Division 1 clubs and 4 with Division 2 clubs. The plan was for teams to play both home and away games within their group to decide the winners, who then continued in the knock-out stage. This worked for groups A to F but groups G and H were unable to all play games, and would not have affected which club finished top of each group.

Group A

Group B

Group C

Group D

Group E

Group F

Group G

Group H

Knock-out stage
Source: Non-League Matters

References

1962-63
9